Admiral Sir Alban Thomas Buckley Curteis KCB CVO DSO (13 January 1887 – 27 November 1961) was a Royal Navy officer who went on to be Senior British Naval Officer, Western Atlantic.

Naval career
Curteis joined the Royal Navy in 1902 and served in World War I. He was appointed Commanding Officer of HMS Verity in 1922 and Flag Captain commanding  and Chief of Staff to the Commander-in-Chief of the America and West Indies Station in 1928. He was appointed Flag Captain commanding  and Captain of the Fleet to the Commander-in-Chief of the Home Fleet in 1931 before becoming Captain of the Royal Naval College, Dartmouth in 1933. He became Captain of the Fleet for the Home Fleet in 1935 and went on to be Commander of the Royal Naval Barracks at Devonport in 1938.

He served in World War II as Commander of the 2nd Cruiser Squadron from 1940 and then as Commander of the 2nd Battle Squadron and Second-in-Command of the Home Fleet from 1941. In June 1942 he led Operation Harpoon, a mission to re-supply Malta which was becoming very short of food and medical supplies; the plan was to despatch a naval convoy from Alexandria but in the event the convoy came under Italian naval attack and suffered heavy losses. He was made Senior British Naval Officer, Western Atlantic in 1942 and retired in 1944.

Family
In 1915 he married Helen Morrall; they had one son and one daughter. In 1941 he married Freda Morrall.

References

1887 births
1961 deaths
Royal Navy officers of World War I
Royal Navy admirals of World War II
Knights Commander of the Order of the Bath
Commanders of the Royal Victorian Order
Companions of the Distinguished Service Order
Place of birth missing
Bermuda in World War II